This is a list of ambassadors of the United States to Yemen.

Before 1990, Yemen had consisted of two states: North Yemen and South Yemen. The United States had diplomatic relations with North Yemen since 1946. Relations with South Yemen had been established in 1967 and broken in 1969.

On May 22, 1990, the Yemen Arab Republic (North Yemen) and the People's Democratic Republic of Yemen (South Yemen) united and formed a united Republic of Yemen. The existing U.S. embassy in San'a (North Yemen) became the embassy for the new republic. At that time, there was no U.S. ambassador to South Yemen, so the then-current ambassador to North Yemen Charles Franklin Dunbar, continued to serve as the ambassador to united Yemen until the end of his tour in 1991.

The U.S. Embassy in Sanaa suspended operations on February 11, 2015, and all U.S. personnel were withdrawn after security conditions deteriorated in the midst of the Yemeni civil war; however, the United States did not sever diplomatic relations with Yemen. Working from the U.S. Embassy in Riyadh, Saudi Arabia under the authority of the U.S. Ambassador to Yemen, U.S. diplomats in the Yemen Affairs Unit maintained regular dialogue with the Republic of Yemen Government.

For U.S. ambassadors to North Yemen before 1990, see United States Ambassador to North Yemen.

For U.S. ambassadors to South Yemen prior to 1990, see United States Ambassador to South Yemen.

List of ambassadors

See also
United States - Yemen relations
Foreign relations of Yemen
Ambassadors of the United States

Notes

References
United States Department of State: Background Notes on Yemen

External links
 United States Department of State: Chiefs of Mission for Yemen
 United States Department of State: Yemen
 United States Embassy in Sana'a

United States
Yemen